Parakou is the largest city in northern Benin, with an estimated population of around 206,667 people, and capital of the Borgou Department. Administratively the commune of Parakou makes up one of Benin's 77 communes. Since 2015, its mayor is Souradjou Adamou Karimou.

History 
The city was founded in the 16th century by traders. Among traders there is a first occupant of the Old City  , a  hunter named sina kpebiegi. Even the traditional leaders are living from slaves trade the population are living from fishing and agriculture.

Economy
Parakou lies on the main north-south highway RNIE 2 and at the end of a railway to Cotonou.

Markets 
This has made it an important market town, with major industries including cotton and textiles, peanut oil manufacture and brewing. The town grew initially from revenue generated from passing merchants that took goods from the region across the Sahara and the Mediterranean to Europe. Parakou later became well known in the slave trade. Later traders concentrated on cotton and Parakou remains the hub of the Beninese cotton trade to this day, with considerable interest from Europe.

There are several markets trading, notably the largest, Grand Marché Arzeke which one of the largest in Benin, an international market spanning over a block. This market has a large covered hall overlapping onto the streets with stalls, with 500 and 1000 vendors. The market sells an enormous range of goods from items of pottery including vases and bowls, to cotton textiles, cassettes and CD's of local and international artists, local spices, fruits, gasaru/wagasi (cow's milk cheese) and kitchen utensils. Another market, located several blocks north, is called the "Marché Kobo Kobo", which lies across the street from the French Cultural Centre. Marché Kobo Kobo is known for its clothing retailing, primarily second hand goods, and in another section livestock. The Marché Depot is located near Parakou Railway Station around numerous hotels and sells mostly food but also calabashes and baskets. There is also the Marché Guema, located next to Guema Church on the northern road to Malanville in the Albarika quarter of the city. The market was founded by the Somba people of the Atacora, and takes place every Sunday at 10 am. The market consists of a collection of grass huts, and specialises in beef and pork and local millet beer known as choukachou or simply "chouk".

Inland Port 
Parakou is the site of a proposed inland port.

The dry port is a multi-modal platform located 3 km from the centre of Parakou, close to the railway.  It gives the Backbone Project a strategic position for imports and exports to neighbouring countries, notably Burkina Faso, Mali, Niger, Nigeria and Togo.

Demographics

The name, Parakou, is derived from a Dendi word meaning "the city of everyone", named for the city's diversity of ethnicities. As a market town attracting many people as a trading and stop-off point, Parakou has a large mix of African ethnicities, including  fula, Dendi, Somba, Fon, Mina, Bariba, Djerma, Yoruba (of the Nago tribe), Hausa, Kabrais, Warma, and Tuareg.

In 1979 the city was reported as having 60,915 people and according to the official census of 1992, Parakou had a population of 103,577. In the last 15–20 years the population of Parakou has nearly doubled with 149,819 recorded in 2002 and with the most recent census in 2013, the population was 255,478.

Climate

Culture 

The city has a museum, the Musée en Plein Air de Parakou.

Administration
Parakou is one of the 77 official communes of Benin. The mayor of the commune and city as of 2008 is Samou Seidou Adambi.

Villages
The commune of Parakou contains the following villages:

Amawihon, Bakaga, Bakounkparou, Bakounourou, Baperou, Bereyadou, Borarou, Darou Kourarou, Debregourou, Dokparou, Douerou, Forane Kparou, Gagbebou, Ganou, Ga Yakabou, Gommboko, Gorobani, Gouforou, Goutere, Guema, Guererou, Guinrerou, Kaborokpo, Kabro, Karobouarou, Kipare, Konkoma, Koumerou, Kperou Guera, Moundouro, Nekinparo, Nikikperou, Ouroungourou, Pepekino, Pepepeterou, Sanro, Senouorou, Sokoumeno, Sokouno, Sonoumo, Sourou, Suinrou, Tabayorourou, Tankaro, Tankaro Ga, Teougourou Gando, Tian, Tinekonparou, Tora, Tourou, Wansirou, Weria, Wore, Worora, Yakassirou

Education 
Parakou is home to one university, the University of Parakou, founded in 2001.

Places of worship    
  
Among the places of worship, most predominant are Muslim mosques. There are also several Christian denominations represented: Roman Catholic Archdiocese of Parakou (Catholic Church), Protestant Methodist Church in Benin (World Methodist Council), Union of Baptist Churches of Benin (Baptist World Alliance), Living Faith Church Worldwide, Redeemed Christian Church of God and the Assemblies of God.

Transport

Parakou Railway Station is the last railway station on the Parakou-Cotonou railway, however at present it is not open to passenger transportation. Both the national highways RNIE 2 and RNIE 6 pass through Parakou. The city is also served by Parakou Airport. The government has proposed extending the railway to Dosso in Niger.

Sport
The main football clubs are Dynamo Unacob FC de Parakou and Buffles du Borgou FC which play in the Benin Premier League, the highest division of Beninese football.

Notable people
Hubert Maga, first President of Benin (1916–2000)
Chabi Mama, politician (1921–1996)
Arouna Mama, politician (1925–1974)
Marc Aillet, French bishop
Nouhoum Kobéna, former footballer
Achille Rouga, former footballer
Mohamed Chikoto, footballer
Steve Mounié, footballer
Abdel Fadel Suanon, footballer

See also 

 Railway stations in Benin
 West Africa Regional Rail Integration

References

Bibliography

 .
 

 
Communes of Benin
Populated places in Benin